Rahgan (also Romanized as Rāhgān; also known as Rāhakān and Rāhkān) is a village in Rahgan Rural District, Khafr District, Jahrom County, Fars Province, Iran. At the 2006 census, its population was 298, in 57 families.

References 

Populated places in  Jahrom County